The 1981 Burlington mayoral election was held March 3, 1981. Bernie Sanders, who ran as an independent candidate, defeated incumbent Democratic Mayor Gordon Paquette, who was seeking a sixth term as Mayor of Burlington, Vermont, and Richard Bove.

Paquette had easily won reelection to the mayoralty in the 1973, 1975, and 1979 elections and the Democratic Party controlled ten of the thirteen city council seats. Sanders ran in the election due to the amount of support he received in Burlington during his 1976 gubernatorial campaign. Bove initially ran as a Democrat, but became an independent after losing in the primary to Paquette. The Republican Party did not field a candidate and the Citizens Party endorsed Sanders after failing to run Greg Guma. Sanders initially led Paquette by twenty-two votes, but his total vote lead was later decreased to ten votes following a recount.

Sanders' victory was the first time a socialist was elected mayor of a place in New England since the election of Jasper McLevy as mayor of Bridgeport, Connecticut during the 1950s. Sanders would later be reelected as mayor in the 1983, 1985, and 1987 elections before being elected to the United States House of Representatives in 1990 and then the United States Senate in 2006.

Background

Gordon Paquette, a member of the city council, won election to the mayoralty of Burlington, Vermont, with the Democratic nomination in the 1971 election. Paquette was reelected as mayor in the 1973, 1975, 1977, and 1979 elections with him taking over seventy percent of the popular vote in each election except in 1977. After the 1980 elections the Democratic Party controlled ten of the thirteen city council seats.

Campaign

Candidates

Democratic

Paquette announced on January 6, 1981, that he would seek reelection to a sixth term. Richard Bove, a former member of the Burlington Board of Alderman and a member of Burlington's Fire Commission, announced on January 16, that he would seek the Democratic nomination for mayor against Paquette. Bove's decision to run was inspired by discontent with Paquette's raise of taxes, as well as a perceived lack of benefits from Burlington's "urban renewal" projects. Paquette defeated Bove for the Democratic nomination by a vote of 133 to 19.

Republican

The Republican Party did not run a candidate in the 1979 mayoral election, after unsuccessfully asking former Chief of Police Robert G. Abare and state Representative Theodore M. Riehle III to run.

Other candidates

Bernie Sanders announced on November 8, 1980, that he would seek the mayoral office and formally announced his campaign on December 16, at a press conference in city hall. Sanders had been convinced to run for the mayoralty by Richard Sugarman, an Orthodox Jewish scholar at the University of Vermont, had shown Sanders a ward-by-ward breakdown of the 1976 Vermont gubernatorial election, in which Sanders had run, which showed him receiving 12% of the vote in Burlington despite only getting 6% statewide. Sanders selected Linda Niedweske to serve as his campaign manager. The Citizens Party attempted to have Greg Guma run with their nomination for mayor, but Guma declined as it would be "difficult to run against another progressive candidate".

After losing the Democratic primary, Bove announced that he would seek the mayoral office as an independent candidate. Joseph McGrath, a retired building superintendent, also filed to run as an independent candidate.

Results and demographics

Sanders won in the mayoral election initially by twenty-two votes against Paquette, Bove, and McGrath, but the lead was later reduced to ten votes after a recount. His campaign spent around $4,000. Paquette did not contest the results of the recount. On April 6, Sanders was sworn in as Mayor of Burlington, becoming the first socialist mayor in New England since Jasper McLevy in Bridgeport, Connecticut during the 1940s and 1950s.

Paquette's loss of the election was attributed to his own shortcomings. He did not actively campaign, as he did not consider Sanders and Bove serious challengers, with Sanders having never previously won an election. Paquette was also considered to have lost because he proposed an unpopular 65 cent per $100 raise in taxes that Sanders opposed. There was also a significant student population in Burlington caused by the University of Vermont ending the building of dormitories in 1972.

Results

Results by ward before recount

Endorsements

References

Burlington, Vermont
1981
1981 Vermont elections
Bernie Sanders